The Barbary slave trade involved slave markets on the Barbary Coast of North Africa, which included the Ottoman states of Algeria, Tunisia and Tripolitania and the independent sultanate of Morocco, between the 16th and 19th century. The Ottoman states in North Africa were nominally under Ottoman suzerainty. 
 
European slaves were acquired by Barbary pirates in slave raids on ships and by raids on coastal towns from Italy to the Netherlands, Ireland and the southwest of Britain, as far north as Iceland and into the Eastern Mediterranean.

The Ottoman Eastern Mediterranean was the scene of intense piracy.  As late as the 18th century, piracy continued to be a "consistent threat to maritime traffic in the Aegean".

Extent 

Robert Davis estimates that slave traders from Tunis, Algiers, and Tripoli enslaved 1 million to 1.25 million Europeans in North Africa, from the beginning of the 16th century to the middle of the 18th (these numbers do not include the European people who were enslaved by Morocco and by other raiders and traders of the Mediterranean Sea coast). To extrapolate his numbers, Davis assumes the number of European slaves captured by Barbary pirates remained roughly constant for a 250-year period, stating:

Other historians have challenged Davis' numbers. David Earle cautions that the picture of Europeans slaves is clouded by the fact the corsairs also seized non-Christian whites from eastern Europe and black people from western Africa. Earle has questioned Robert Davis' estimates: “His figures sound a bit dodgy and I think he may be exaggerating.”

Middle East expert and  researcher John Wright cautions that modern estimates are based on back-calculations from human observation. A second book by Davis, Holy War and Human Bondage: Tales of Christian-Muslim Slavery in the Early-Modern Mediterranean, widened its focus to related slavery.

The authorities of Ottoman and pre-Ottoman times kept no relevant official records, but  observers in the late 1500s and early 1600s estimated that around 35,000 European slaves were held throughout this period on the Barbary Coast, across Tripoli and Tunis, but mostly in Algiers. The majority were sailors (particularly those who were English), taken with their ships, but others were fishermen and coastal villagers.  However, most of these captives were people from lands close to Africa, particularly Italy.

From bases on the Barbary coast, North Africa, the Barbary pirates raided ships traveling through the Mediterranean and along the northern and western coasts of Africa, plundering their cargo and enslaving the people they captured. From at least 1500, the pirates also conducted raids on seaside towns of Italy, Spain, France, England, the Netherlands and as far away as Iceland, capturing men, women and children. In 1544, Hayreddin Barbarossa captured the island of Ischia, taking 4,000 prisoners, and enslaved some 2,000–7,000 inhabitants of Lipari. In 1551, Ottoman corsair Dragut enslaved the entire population of the Maltese island of Gozo, between 5,000 and 6,000, sending them to Ottoman Tripolitania. In 1554 corsairs under Dragut sacked Vieste, beheaded 5,000 of its inhabitants, and abducted another 6,000. The Balearic Islands were invaded in 1558, and 4,000 people were taken into slavery. In 1618 the Algerian pirates attacked the Canary Islands taking 1000 captives to be sold as slaves. On some occasions, settlements such as Baltimore in Ireland were abandoned following a raid, only being resettled many years later. Between 1609 and 1616, England alone lost 466 merchant ships to Barbary pirates.

While Barbary corsairs looted the cargo of ships they captured, their primary goal was to capture non-Muslim people for sale as slaves or for ransom. Those who had family or friends who might ransom them were held captive; the most famous of these was the author Miguel de Cervantes, who was held for almost five years - from 1575 to 1580. Others were sold into various types of servitude. Captives who converted to Islam were generally freed, since enslavement of Muslims was prohibited; but this meant that they could never return to their native countries.

Customs' statistics from the 16th and 17th century suggest that Istanbul's additional slave imports from the Black Sea may have totaled around 2.5 million from 1450 to 1700.
The markets declined after Sweden and the United States defeated the Barbary States in the Barbary Wars (1800–1815). A US Navy expedition under Commodore Edward Preble engaged gunboats and fortifications in Tripoli in 1804. A British diplomatic mission to Algiers led to the Dey to agree to release some Sardinian slaves. However, the moment the British left, the Dey ordered the Sardinians massacred; the same fleet joined by some Dutch warships returned and delivered a nine-hour bombardment of Algiers in 1816 leading to the Dey accepting a new agreement in which he promised to end his slavery operations. Despite this, the trade continued, only ending with the French conquest of Algeria (1830–1847). The Kingdom of Morocco had already suppressed piracy and recognized the United States as an independent country in 1776.

Origins 

The towns on the North African coast were recorded in Roman times for their slave markets, and this trend continued into the medieval age. The Barbary Coast increased in influence in the 15th century, when the Ottoman Empire took over as rulers of the area. Coupled with this was an influx of Sephardi Jews and Moorish refugees, newly expelled from Spain after the Reconquista.

With Ottoman protection and a host of destitute immigrants, the coastline soon became reputed for piracy. Crews from the seized ships were either enslaved or ransomed. Between 1580 and 1680, there were in Barbary around 15,000 renegades, Christian Europeans who converted to Islam, and half of the corsair captains were in fact renegades. Some of them were slaves that converted to Islam but most had probably never been slaves and had come to North Africa looking for opportunity.

Rise of the Barbary pirates 

After a revolt in the mid-17th century reduced the ruling Ottoman Pashas to little more than figureheads in the region, the towns of Tripoli, Algiers, Tunis, and others became independent in all but name. Without a large central authority and its laws, the pirates themselves started to gain much influence.

In 1785 when Thomas Jefferson and John Adams went to London to negotiate with Tripoli's envoy, Ambassador Sidi Haji Abdrahaman, they asked him what right he had to take slaves in this way. He replied that the "right" was "founded on the Laws of the Prophet, that it was written in their Koran that all nations who should not have answered their authority were sinners, that it was their right and duty to make war upon them wherever they could be found, and to make slaves of all they could take as prisoners, and that every Mussulman who should be slain in battle was sure to go to Paradise".

Pirate raids for the acquisition of slaves occurred in towns and villages on the African Atlantic seaboard, as well as in Europe. Reports of Barbary raids and kidnappings of those in Italy, Spain, France, Portugal, England, Netherlands, Ireland, Scotland, Wales, and as far north as Iceland exist from between the 16th to the 19th centuries. Robert Davis estimated that between 1 and 1.25 million Europeans were captured by pirates and sold as slaves in Tunis, Algiers and Tripoli during this time period. The slave trade in Europeans in other parts of the Mediterranean is not included in this estimation.  However, other historians such as David Earle have questioned Robert Davis' estimates: “His figures sound a bit dodgy and I think he may be exaggerating.”

Famous accounts of Barbary slave raids include a mention in the diary of Samuel Pepys and a raid on the coastal village of Baltimore, Ireland, during which pirates left with the entire populace of the settlement. The attack was led by a Dutch captain, Jan Janszoon van Haarlem, also known as Murad Reis the Younger.  Janszoon also led the 1627 raid on Iceland. Such raids in the Mediterranean were so frequent and devastating that the coastline between Venice and Málaga suffered widespread depopulation, and settlement there was discouraged. In fact, it was said that "there was no one left to capture any longer."

In 1627 a group known as the Salé Rovers, from the Republic of Salé (now Salé in Morocco) occupied Lundy for five years. These Barbary Pirates, under the command of Janszoon, flew an Ottoman flag over the island. Slaving raids were made embarking from Lundy by the Barbary Pirates, and captured Europeans were held on Lundy before being sent to Algiers to be sold as slaves.

The power and influence of these pirates during this time was such that nations including the United States paid tribute in order to stave off their attacks. Supplies from the Black Sea appear to have been even larger. A compilation of partial statistics and patchy estimates indicates that almost 2 million Russians, Ukrainians, and Poles were seized from 1468 to 1694. Additionally, there were slaves from the Caucasus obtained by a mixture of raiding and trading. 16th- and 17th-century customs statistics suggest that Istanbul's slave import from the Black Sea may have totaled around 2.5 million from 1450 to 1700.

An account of the later phase of the trade was published in 1740 by Englishman Thomas Pellow, who had escaped from Morocco after 21 years of slavery, having been captured from a ship in 1716 as an 11 year-old boy.

Decline 

In the first years of the 19th century, the United States, allied with European nations, fought and won the First and the Second Barbary Wars against the pirates.  The wars were a direct response of the American, British, French and the Dutch states to the raids and the slave trade by the Barbary pirates against them, which ended in the 1830s, when the region was conquered by France. The Barbary slave trade and slave markets in the Mediterranean declined and eventually disappeared after the European occupations.

After an Anglo-Dutch bombardment in 1816 of Algiers on 27 August,  led by Admiral Edward Pellew, 1st Viscount Exmouth, disabled most of the Pirate fleet, the Dey of Algiers was forced to agree to terms which included the release of the surviving 1,200 slaves (mostly from Sardinia) and the cessation of their practice of enslaving Europeans. After being defeated in this period of formal hostilities with European and American powers, the Barbary states went into decline.

The Barbary pirates refused to cease their slaving operations, resulting in another bombardment by a Royal Navy fleet against Algiers in 1824. France invaded Algiers in 1830, placing it under colonial rule. Tunis was similarly invaded by France in 1881. Tripoli returned to direct Ottoman control in 1835, before falling into Italian hands in the 1911 Italo-Turkish War. As such, the slave traders now found that they had to work in accordance with the laws of their governors, and could no longer look to self-regulation. The slave trade ceased on the Barbary coast in the 19th and 20th centuries or when European governments passed laws granting emancipation to slaves.

The word razzia was borrowed via Italian and French from Maghrebi Arabic ghaziya, originally referring to slave raids conducted by Barbary pirates.

See also 
 Barbary corsairs
 Barbary Wars
 Crimean–Nogai raids into East Slavic lands
 North African slave narratives
 Republic of Salé
 Sklavenkasse
 Slavery in the Ottoman Empire
 Turkish Abductions

References

Further reading 

The Thomas Jefferson Papers - America and the Barbary Pirates - (American Memory from the Library of Congress)

External links 

When Europeans Were Slaves: Research Suggests White Slavery Was Much More Common Than Previously Believed
British Slaves on the Barbary Coast
Seabed gold 'clue to white slavers'
America and the Barbary Pirates: An International Battle Against an Unconventional Foe
Barbary Captivity Narratives 
History of Kythera
Pirates, Privateers and the Ottoman Empire in the Early Modern Mediterranean
Kythira History

16th-century establishments in Africa
19th-century establishments in Africa
Islam and slavery
Barbary slave trade
Barbary pirates
Piracy in the Mediterranean
Early Modern Morocco
Social history of Tunisia
History of Tripolitania
Arab history
Persecution of Christians by Muslims
Slavery in the Ottoman Empire